Antrim is an unincorporated community in Duncan Township, Tioga County, in the U.S. state of Pennsylvania. It lies slightly east of Pennsylvania Route 287 between Williamsport and Wellsboro.

References

Unincorporated communities in Tioga County, Pennsylvania
Unincorporated communities in Pennsylvania